Cliffton Gonsalves (born 15 February 1987) is a Goan footballer who played as a striker for Dempo S.C. in the I-League.

Career

Dempo
After joining the Dempo U16 team at the age of 14 Gonsalves then graduated to the U18, U19, and U20 team. He then made his debut for the first-team during the 2007–08 season and he scored his first goal in the I-League at the age of 19 against Viva Kerala FC on 4 January 2008. He then scored again during the 2008–09 I-League he scored another goal against Mumbai on 13 February 2009. He then scored 4 more goals during the 2010-11 I-League.

Personal life
Cliffton is the son of former Dempo player Camilo Gonsalves.

References

Footballers from Goa
1987 births
Living people
I-League players
Dempo SC players
People from North Goa district
Association football forwards
Indian footballers